Delias dice is a butterfly in the family Pieridae. It was described by Samuel Constantinus Snellen van Vollenhoven in 1865. It is  endemic to New Guinea in  the Australasian realm.

Subspecies
Delias dice dice (Central Irian Jaya)
Delias dice fulvoflava Rothschild, 1915 (Snow Mtns, Irian Jaya)
Delias dice latimarginata Joicey & Talbot, 1925 (Weyland Mtns, Irian Jaya)
Delias dice mitisana Strand, 1916 (Vogelkop, Irian Jaya & Waigeu Island)
Delias dice rectifascia Talbot, 1928 (Rossel Island)
Delias dice samarai Joicey & Talbot, 1916 (south-western Papua New Guinea)

References

External links
Delias at Markku Savela's Lepidoptera and Some Other Life Forms

dice
Butterflies described in 1865
Endemic fauna of New Guinea
Butterflies of Oceania
Taxa named by Samuel Constantinus Snellen van Vollenhoven